Ficus meizonochlamys is a species of plant in the family Moraceae. It is endemic to Cuba.

References

Sources

Flora of Cuba
meizonochlamys
Endangered plants
Endemic flora of Cuba
Taxonomy articles created by Polbot